Philip Haagdoren (born 25 June 1970) is a Belgian former footballer. He played in one match for the Belgium national football team in 1997.

Honours
Lierse
Belgian First Division: 1996–97

References

External links
 

1970 births
Living people
Belgian footballers
Belgium international footballers
Association football midfielders
People from Lommel
Footballers from Limburg (Belgium)